St Mary, Itchen Stoke, Hampshire, is a redundant Anglican church in the parish of Itchen Stoke and Ovington. It has been designated by English Heritage as a Grade II* listed building, and is under the care of the Churches Conservation Trust.

History

St Mary is the third church to have been built in the village of Itchen Stoke. The first was built before 1270 on a site near the River Itchen, but it suffered from damp, became dilapidated and was pulled down around 1830. Some traces of it remain. The second church which replaced it was built on land in the centre of the village which was donated for the purpose by Lord Ashburton, who held the advowson. Charles Ranken Conybeare, son of the geologist William Daniel Conybeare, became the incumbent in April 1857, but he took a dislike to the church, complaining that it was cold and damp, and that remedying these defects would be more expensive than demolishing and replacing it. Consent for the demolition was given by the Bishop of Winchester and the new Lord Ashburton, and the present church was erected on the same site in 1866.

The architect of the new church was Charles Conybeare's younger brother Henry Conybeare, a civil engineer with an interest in Gothic architecture, who had designed the Afghan Church in Colaba, Mumbai, where he had also been responsible for improving the city's sanitation.

Architecture
Sir Nikolaus Pevsner described St Mary as "serious and impressive" and "quite a remarkable church for its date". It is approached by a steep path up from the main road and the design was clearly influenced by the Sainte Chapelle in Paris.

Exterior
 The church is of brown and grey rubble stone with limestone dressings. Above the west entrance door is a rose window, given by Lady Ashburton in memory of her husband. At the east end is a polygonal apse, whose gables have two-light bar tracery windows. There are four sets of three tall lancet windows in the side walls of the church. The steep roof is of purple and grey-green slates in a diamond-shaped pattern. There is a belfry with two bells between the nave and the chancel.

Interior

The west door opens into a wide vestibule in three compartments with a vaulted stone roof. It contains a stone font recovered from the previous church.  Beyond it is the tall nave divided into bays by wall columns. It has a timber roof.

The chancel/apse is semi-octagonal with moulded ribs and wall columns. It has a vaulted stone roof. The five long arched windows of two lights with small rose windows contain little pieces of clear, red, blue and green glass arranged in geometrical patterns. The circular floor is covered with glazed brown and green tiles laid out in the form of a labyrinth, as in Chartres Cathedral.

The furnishings, contemporary with the church, include:
a font of coloured vitreous enamel, gilt bronze and black Californian marble, based on the tomb of Mary of Burgundy in the Church of Our Lady, Bruges.
a pulpit with five recessed panels filled with cast iron scrollwork and foliage
pews with ends similar to the panels of the pulpit.

See also
List of churches preserved by the Churches Conservation Trust in South East England

References

Church of England church buildings in Hampshire
Grade II* listed churches in Hampshire
Churches completed in 1866
19th-century Church of England church buildings
Gothic Revival church buildings in England
Gothic Revival architecture in Hampshire
Churches preserved by the Churches Conservation Trust
1866 establishments in England